Lampros Kontogiannis Gómez (born 1 August 1988) is a Mexican professional footballer who plays as a centre-back.

Club career 
Kontogiannis began his career with Segunda División side F.S. Manzanillo in the 2007–08 season. He then signed a contract in May 2008 with Club América. He debuted with América on 17 August 2008 coming in as a sub in the 66 minute against Pachuca in a 1–1 draw.

He also played for the reserve side Socio Águila in the 2008–09 season. In June 2011, he moved to club UANL located in Monterrey.

Personal life 
Kontogiannis is of Greek descent which would have allowed him to play for the Greece national team as well as the Mexico national team having been born in Mexico. His father is from Greece and his mother from Mexico.

Honours 
Tigres UANL
Mexican Primera División: Apertura 2011

Melgar
Peruvian Primera División: 2015

References

External links 
 
 Player Profile

1988 births
Living people
Association football defenders
Footballers from Colima
Mexican footballers
Sportspeople from Manzanillo, Colima
Mexican people of Greek descent
Liga MX players
Ascenso MX players
Peruvian Primera División players
Club América footballers
Albinegros de Orizaba footballers
Tigres UANL footballers
Correcaminos UAT footballers
FBC Melgar footballers
Real Garcilaso footballers
C.D. Veracruz footballers
Cienciano footballers
Mexican expatriate footballers
Mexican expatriate sportspeople in Peru
Expatriate footballers in Peru